Win the Week is an Australian television comedy quiz show, which premiered on the ABC on 23 June 2021. The series is presented by Alex Lee, who quizzes three teams of paired celebrities and everyday Australian captains on the week's top news stories. At the end of each round, the team captains had the opportunity to "Stay" with their celebrity teammate or "Betray" them by swapping them with a celebrity from another team. In the first series, the winner of each show won a framed themed calendar with the week they had won coloured in gold. From the second series, the winner of each show won a golden "Betray" buzzer trophy.

It was revealed in February 2022 that Win The Week would be returning for a second series, which premiered on 3 August 2022.

in February 2023, the ABC announced that Win The Week would not be returning in 2023.

Format

Segments
Mixed Messages: Alex reads out a fake news headline created from combing two headlines from the past week. Team members buzz in to guess one of the stories, while their teammate is left to guess the other half. Each story guessed is worth five points.
Double or Nothing: Questions are asked in pairs by Alex. Team captains must buzz in to answer the first question correctly but only win 10 points if their celebrity team member answers a related follow-up question correctly as well.
Up to the Minute: News events from the past week within one minute.
Picture This: Team members are each given a picture which they must describe to their partner and put together to work out the corresponding news story before their time runs out. Each correct guess is worth 15 points.
This Week in History: News events from the past week in previous years. Each correct guess is worth 15 points.
Bleeping News: Teams are presented with a news segment with two parts bleeped out. Team captains must guess the first bleep while celebrities guess the second bleep. Each correct guess is worth 15 points.
Pants: Alex reads a headline where one word has been replaced with the word "pants". Teams must buzz in to guess each replaced word for 10 points but lose 10 points if they answer incorrectly.

Series overview
<onlyinclude>

Episodes

Series 1 (2021)
Note: Winners are listed in bold

Series 2 (2022)
The second series of the show premiered on 3 August 2022.

Note: Winners are listed in bold

Notes

References

External links
 

Australian Broadcasting Corporation original programming
2020s Australian game shows
2021 Australian television series debuts

English-language television shows
Television shows set in Sydney